"Make My Dreams a Reality" is a song written and performed by GQ. It reached No. 8 on the U.S. R&B chart in 1979. The song was featured on their 1979 album, Disco Nights and later became the B-side to their next single, "I Do Love You".

The song was produced by Jimmy Simpson and Beau Ray Fleming.

References

1979 songs
1979 singles
GQ (band) songs
Arista Records singles